St. Jacob's Church is a historic Russian Orthodox church in Napaskiak, Alaska, United States. Now it is under Diocese of Alaska of the Orthodox Church in America It was listed on the National Register of Historic Places in 1980.

It has a  plan, extended out from an original  building length, from when it was built sometime in the early 1900s.  The western  part of the building was added in two stages over the course of the 20th century, and was done to closely match the properties of the existing structure.  The second addition added a vestibule area and a small bell tower topped by an Orthodox onion dome.  The building is clad in novelty siding.

See also
National Register of Historic Places listings in Bethel Census Area, Alaska

References 

Buildings and structures in Bethel Census Area, Alaska
Churches on the National Register of Historic Places in Alaska
Russian Orthodox church buildings in Alaska
Buildings and structures on the National Register of Historic Places in Bethel Census Area, Alaska